Alejo Julio Argentino Roca Paz (July 17, 1843 – October 19, 1914) was an army general and statesman who served as President of Argentina from 1880 to 1886 and from 1898 to 1904. Roca is the most important representative of the Generation of '80 and is known for directing the Conquest of the Desert, a series of military campaigns against the indigenous peoples of Patagonia sometimes considered a genocide.  

During his two terms as president, many important changes occurred, particularly major infrastructure projects of railroads and port facilities; increased foreign investment, along with immigration from Europe; large-scale immigration from southern Europe; expansion of the agricultural and pastoral sectors of the economy; and laicizing legislation strengthening state power. 

Roca's main foreign policy concern was to set the limits with Chile, which had never been determined with precision. In 1881 Argentina gained territory by treaty with Chile.

Upbringing and early career

Roca was born in the northwestern city of San Miguel de Tucumán in 1843 into a prominent local family. He graduated from the National College in Concepción del Uruguay, Entre Ríos. Before he was 15, Roca joined the army of the Argentine Confederation, on 19 March 1858. While still an adolescent, he went to fight as a junior artillery officer in the struggle between Buenos Aires and the interior provinces, first on the side of the provinces and later on behalf of the capital. He also fought in the War of the Triple Alliance against Paraguay between 1865 and 1870. Roca rose to the rank of colonel serving in the war to suppress the revolt of Ricardo López Jordán in Entre Ríos. President Nicolás Avellaneda later promoted him to General after his victory over rebel general José M. Arredondo in the battle of Santa Rosa, leading the loyalist forces. Roca saw the army "as an agent of national unification," and his experience in the army "broadened his understanding of Argentina and the provincial upper class."

Political beginnings

In 1878, during Avellaneda's presidency, he became Minister of War and it was his task to prepare a campaign that would bring an end to the "frontier problem" after the failure of the plan of Adolfo Alsina (his predecessor). A number of indigenous groups defended their traditional territories and frequently assaulted non-indigenous frontier settlements, taking horses and cattle, and capturing women and children, who were enslaved or offered as brides to the warriors. Roca's approach to dealing with the Indian communities of the Pampas, however, was completely different from Alsina's, who had ordered the construction of a ditch and a defensive line of small fortresses across the Province of Buenos Aires. Roca saw no way to end native attacks (malones) but by putting under effective government control all land up to the Río Negro in a campaign (known as the Conquest of the Desert) that would "extinguish, subdue or expel" the Indians who lived there. "He began the campaign against the Ranqueles", which eventually resulted in the "transfer of 35% of national territory from the Indians to local caudillos. This land conquest would also strengthen Argentina's strategic position against Chile.

He devised a "tentacle" move, with waves of 6,000 men cavalry units stemming coordinately from Mendoza, Córdoba, Santa Fé and Buenos Aires in July 1878 and April 1879 respectively, with an official toll of nearly 1,313 Native Americans killed and 15,000 taken as prisoners, and is credited with the liberation of several hundred European hostages.

First presidency

In mid-1879, after the death of Alsina, Roca became the most prestigious leader of the National Autonomous Party, and was proposed as a candidate by Cordoba's governor Miguel Celman, and in Buenos Aires by the doctor Eduardo Wilde; quickly gained the support of most of the Argentine state governors. The April 11 elections for president, which came a sweeping victory for the voters of Roca, except in Buenos Aires and Corrientes. On June 13 the Electoral College met and elected President General Roca and Vice President Francisco Bernabé Madero. But in Buenos Aires it was brewing a revolution against the triumph of Roca. Four days later the fighting began, which ended on June 25 with an agreement between the province and the nation; the revolution of 1880 had cost 3,000 dead. Shortly before the presidential inauguration Roca was passed in Congress federalization of Buenos Aires.

Under his mandate the so-called "laicist laws" (Leyes Laicas) were passed, which nationalized a series of functions that previously were under the control of the Church. He also created the so-called Registro Civil, an index of all births, deaths and marriages. President Roca also made primary education free of charge by nationalizing education institutions run by the Church. This led to a break in relations with the Vatican. Roca presided over an era of rapid economic development fueled by large scale European immigration, railway construction, and booming agricultural exports. In May 1886 Roca was the subject of a failed assassination attempt.

Continuing political involvement

Roca himself had put forward Juárez Celman as his successor, who was his brother-in-law. However, Celman distanced himself from Roca. Celman's government was ultimately tarnished by the Baring crisis and corruption allegations.

Roca did not participate in the 1890 revolution attempt against Celman, which was instigated by Leandro N. Alem and Bartolomé Mitre (Unión Cívica, later Unión Cívica Radical). However, he was pleased in the resulting weakness of Miguel Juárez Celman. 

After his first presidency Roca remained important politically, becoming a senator and Minister of the Interior under Carlos Pellegrini. After President Luis Sáenz Peña resigned in January 1895, José Evaristo Uriburu took over the presidency, when Roca was President of the Senate. Because of this, Roca again assumed the duties of President between 28 October 1895 and 8 February 1896, when Uriburu was ill.

Second presidency

In the middle of 1897 the Partido Autonomista Nacional party put forward Roca as a presidential candidate once more. Unopposed, he was able to begin a second regular term in office on 12 October 1898. During his second presidency, the Ley de Residencia law was passed, which made it possible to expel some of Argentina's trade union leaders, who were noncitizen anarchists and socialists deemed dangerous to Argentina.

During this presidency military service was introduced in 1901 and a border dispute with Chile was settled in 1902. Luis Drago, Roca's foreign minister, articulated the Drago Doctrine of 1902 asserting that foreign powers could not collect public debts from sovereign American states by armed force or occupation of territory. Argentina's foreign debt increased in this period, although economic growth continued. Roca was unable to continue his political domination, and he was unable to essentially name his successor.  Roca's second term ended in 1904, and is considered less successful than his first.

Later years

In 1912 Roca was appointed as Special Ambassador of Argentina to Brazil by President Roque Sáenz Peña. Roca returned to Argentina in 1914 and died in Buenos Aires on October 19, 1914. He was buried in La Recoleta Cemetery in Buenos Aires.

His son, Julio Argentino Roca, Jr., became vice-president of Argentina in 1932 to 1938.

Legacy

Roca's thought has been associated with the idea of Juan Bautista Alberdi around the idea of a "possible republic": a republican government, with broad civil and economic freedoms but with an exercise of political life restricted to the ruling elites. The possible republic would give way to the true republic, of a fully democratic character. The ideal of a possible republic, with its politically conservative line, was one of the sources of political conflict that led to the emergence of various oppositions, even from the members of the Generation of '80 themselves.

During the twentieth century, Roca was recognized as one of the statesmen who forged the foundations of the modern Argentine republic. As such, Roca has been honored by designating cities, departments, lakes, streets, avenues, squares, monuments, parks, schools and railway lines throughout the country.  Examples include the city of General Roca in the province of Río Negro, the town of Presidencia Roca in the province of Chaco; the town of Presidente Roca in the province of Santa Fe; the Colonia Roca of the province of Entre Ríos; the General Roca Department of the province of Córdoba. In Buenos Aires, a major thoroughfare and a railway branch are named after him and an equestrian statue of him was erected in 1941. 
 
In recent years, there has been an increasing re-evaluation of Roca's place in Argentine history, particularly his involvement in the Conquest of the Desert.  Some groups claim that he committed genocide against the Native Argentines. Those who consider Roca as genocidal have proposed removing the name Roca from the places and areas with which he has been honored.

Books
 General Julio A. Roca and his campaigns in the Pampa, 1878-1879, by Robert Carter Burns (1960).
 Carlos Pellegrini and the Crisis of the Argentine Elites, 1880-1916, by Douglas W. Richmond (1989).
 Soy Roca, by Félix Luna (1989).

See also
 History of Argentina
 Conquest of the Desert

References

External links

 Biography of Julio A. Roca in Spanish
 Another biography of Julio A. Roca in Spanish
 Roca y el mito del Genocidio, Juan José Cresto for La Nación, in Spanish
 The first presidency of Roca in Spanish 1880-1886

Presidents of Argentina
1843 births
1914 deaths
Argentine military personnel of the Paraguayan War
Members of the Argentine Senate for Buenos Aires
Members of the Argentine Senate for Tucumán
Foreign ministers of Argentina
Defense ministers of Argentina
Argentine diplomats
Ambassadors of Argentina to Brazil
Argentine generals
Conquest of the Desert
Genocide perpetrators
People from San Miguel de Tucumán
Burials at La Recoleta Cemetery
National Autonomist Party politicians
20th-century Argentine politicians
Ministers of Internal Affairs of Argentina
Patrician families of Buenos Aires